The Point Au Fer Reef Light was a lighthouse built in 1916 on Eugene Island in Atchafalaya Bay, Louisiana to mark a new channel across Point Au Feu Reef. It replaced Southwest Reef Light as the entrance light for the Atchafalaya River. The light was deactivated and replaced by a skeleton tower in 1975.  The Coast Guard then offered it to the South Lafourche Cultural and Historical Society, which declined, so the Coast Guard burned it down.

Gallery

References

Lighthouses completed in 1916
Lighthouses in Louisiana